"Hold On to 18" is a song by American glam metal band Black 'n Blue from their eponymous debut album, Black 'n Blue. After being released as a promo in Japan, the song was released as the band's second single. The song was written by Jaime St. James and Tommy Thayer, and was the band's only single to chart, reaching number 50 on the Billboard Top Rock Tracks chart.

An earlier version of the song on the B-side of the single "Chains Around Heaven" was featured on the second and third pressings of the compilation album Metal Massacre (1982) alongside bands such as Metallica and Cirith Ungol.

Chart performance

References

1984 debut singles
1984 songs
Black 'n Blue songs
Songs written by Tommy Thayer